The Gatling gun was one of the first rapid-fire weapons and a modern class of rotary cannon.

Gatling may also refer to:

Surname
 Bart Gatling (1871-1950), American football coach
 Chris Gatling (born 1967), American basketball player
 Markeisha Gatling (born 1992), American basketball player
 Richard Jordan Gatling (1818–1903), American inventor who invented the Gatling gun

Other uses
 Gatling Gun (film), the 1968 Italian-Spanish Spaghetti Western film
 The Gatling Gun, the 1969  film originally entitled King Gun, and released in 1971
 Gatling (software),  open-source load testing framework base
 USS Gatling (DD-671), a U.S. Navy Fletcher-class destroyer named for Dr. Richard Jordan Gatling
 Kill No Albatross, a Canadian band formerly known as Gatling